Lambert Maassen (21 September 1941 – 5 May 2018) was a Dutch professional footballer who played for UNA, PSV, ADO Den Haag and the San Francisco Golden Gate Gales as a striker.

References

1941 births
2018 deaths
People from Geldrop
Dutch footballers
VV UNA players
PSV Eindhoven players
ADO Den Haag players
San Francisco Golden Gate Gales players
Eredivisie players
United Soccer Association players
Association football forwards
Dutch expatriate footballers
Dutch expatriate sportspeople in the United States
Expatriate soccer players in the United States
Footballers from North Brabant